Threadgill is a surname. Notable people with the surname include:

Bruce Threadgill (born 1956), American football player
Henry Threadgill (born 1944), American composer, saxophonist, and flautist
Kenneth Threadgill (1909–1987), American country singer and tavern owner
Pyeng Threadgill (born 1977), American blues, jazz and soul blues singer, songwriter and record producer